The  superyacht Excellence was launched by Abeking & Rasmussen at their yard near Lemwerder. Both the yacht's exterior and interior design are the work of Winch Design.

Design 
The hull is built out of steel while the superstructure is made out of aluminium with teak laid decks. The yacht is classed by Lloyd's Register and flagged in the Cayman Islands.

Amenities 
Zero speed stabilizers, gym, elevator, swimming pool, movie theatre, tender garage, swimming platform, air conditioning, BBQ, beach club, jacuzzi, WiFi. On board are also different kind of water toys including a banana, a small sailboat and two WaveRunners.

Performance
She is powered by twin 2,029hp MTU (12V 4000 M65R) diesel engines.

See also
 List of motor yachts by length
 List of yachts built by Abeking & Rasmussen

References

2019 ships
Motor yachts
Ships built in Germany